The 1956 Colorado A&M Aggies football team represented Colorado State College of Agriculture and Mechanic Arts in the Skyline Conference during the 1956 NCAA University Division football season.  In their first season under head coach Don Mullison, the Aggies compiled a 2–7–1 record (2–4–1 against Skyline opponents), finished fifth in the Skyline Conference, and were outscored by opponents by a total of 314 to 156. On defense, the team gave up an average of 31.4 points per game, ranking 110 out of 111 major college teams in scoring defense.

Center Bob Weber received all-conference honors in 1956. The team's statistical leaders included Jerry Callahan with 342 passing yards, Wayne Walter with 471 rushing yards, and Ron McClary with 188 receiving yards.

Schedule

References

Colorado AandM
Colorado State Rams football seasons
Colorado AandM Aggies football